Standard Shaft is located in Mount Pleasant Township, Westmoreland County, Pennsylvania, United States. It is a community located near Mount Pleasant.

History

Standard Shaft, sometimes just called Shaft by the locals, refers to the community that had in roots in the Standard Shaft Mine operation. It was founded in 1886 by the H. C. Frick Coke Company.

Circa 1932, the H. C. Frick Coke Company closed and abandoned the Calumet Mine, located in nearby Calumet and sent a number of the miners to the Standard Shaft Mine near Mount Pleasant, and laid off the rest of the coal miners, leaving them to fend for themselves, with no compensation or means of support.

References

External links

Pittsburgh metropolitan area
Historic American Engineering Record in Pennsylvania
Unincorporated communities in Pennsylvania
Unincorporated communities in Westmoreland County, Pennsylvania
Populated places established in 1886
1886 establishments in Pennsylvania